The Chengde Down is a Chinese breed of cashmere goat. It originates in Hebei Province in northern China, on the border with Liaoning and Inner Mongolia. If hornless it may also be known as the Yanshan Polled.

Characteristics 

The Chengde Down is a well-muscled goat of medium size. It has small erect ears, is usually bearded and may have tassels. It is usually horned in both sexes, but may also be hornless or polled; if polled, it may also be known as the Yanshan Polled, and may be brown in colour. The coat is of medium length and is usually black; it may also be black-and-white or white.

References

Goat breeds
Fiber-producing goat breeds
Meat goat breeds
Goat breeds originating in China